Bohadschia is a genus of sea cucumbers in the family Holothuriidae. They are among the largest, most common, and conspicuous sea cucumbers on coral reefs. They have large, loaf-like bodies that are often strikingly colored.

Species
The following species are recognised in the genus Bohadschia:
 Bohadschia argus Jaeger, 1833
 Bohadschia atra Massin, Rasolofonirina, Conand & Samyn, 1999
 Bohadschia cousteaui Cherbonnier, 1954
 Bohadschia koellikeri (Semper, 1868)
 Bohadschia maculisparsa Cherbonnier & Féral, 1984
 Bohadschia marmorata Jaeger, 1833
 Bohadschia mitsioensis Cherbonnier, 1988
 Bohadschia ocellata Jaeger, 1833
 Bohadschia paradoxa (Selenka, 1867)
 Bohadschia steinitzi Cherbonnier, 1963
 Bohadschia subrubra (Quoy & Gaimard, 1834)
 Bohadschia vitiensis (Semper, 1868)

References

Further reading 
 Francis W.E. Rowe, A review of the family Holothuriidae (Holothuroidea : Aspidochirotida), vol. 18 n°4, Bulletin of the British Museum (Natural History), 1969, 54 p. 

Holothuriidae
Holothuroidea genera